The Mindy Project is an American comedy television series which aired on Fox for three seasons from September 25, 2012, to March 24, 2015. The fourth season began on September 15, 2015, on Hulu. The series stars Mindy Kaling as Mindy Lahiri, a young OB/GYN, as she navigates through her professional life and romantic relationships.

On May 6, 2015 the series was canceled on Fox. On May 15, 2015, Hulu announced it had picked up the series for a 26-episode season 4, with the option of future seasons. On May 4, 2016, Hulu announced it had picked up the series for a 16-episode season 5, which was later reduced to 14. On March 29, 2017, The Mindy Project was renewed for a sixth and final season, which premiered on September 12, 2017.

Series overview

Episodes

Season 1 (2012–13)

Season 2 (2013–14)

Season 3 (2014–15)

Season 4 (2015–16)

Season 5 (2016–17)

Season 6 (2017)

References

External links 
 
 

Lists of American sitcom episodes